De Líder a Leyenda  (English: From Leader to Legend) is the second studio album, by Puerto Rican reggaeton artist Yandel, of the duo Wisin & Yandel; it was released on November 5, 2013. "Hablé de Ti" was released as the lead single of the album on June 7, 2013, the second single "Hasta Abajo" was released on October 15, 2013, "Moviendo Caderas" featuring Reggaeton singer Daddy Yankee was released as third single on February 10, 2014. "Déjate Amar" was released as fourth single on June 27, 2014. "Plakito" featuring Gadiel was released as the fifth official single from the album on July 29, 2014, a remix featuring vocals from Puerto Rican singer Farruko was released on September 25, 2014. At the Latin Grammy Awards of 2014, the album received a nomination Best Urban Music Album. It received a nomination for the Billboard Latin Music Award for Latin Rhythm Album of the Year in 2014.

Critical response

David Jeffries from Allmusic gave the album 4 stars out of 5. Here is an extract of his review:

Chart performance
De Líder a Leyenda debuted at number one on the Billboard Top Latin Albums, becoming his highest debut on the U.S. charts as solo artist, the album also debuted at number nine on the Top Rap Albums and at number 76 on the Billboard 200. On the Mexican Albums Chart the album debuted at number four.

Singles
"Hablé de Ti" served as the lead single from De Líder a Leyenda. The song was released on June 7, 2013. The music video, filmed in Los Ángeles, California, was directed by Carlos Pérez.

"Hasta Abajo", was released as the album's second single on October 15, 2013. The music video was also directed by Carlos Pérez, and filmed in a desert of the South of California.

"Moviendo Caderas" serves as third single, it features Reggaeton singer Daddy Yankee. The song was first released on February 10, 2014. Once again, the video was directed by Carlos Pérez and filmed in his natal Puerto Rico.

"Plakito" featuring his sibling Gadiel was released as the fourth single from the album on July 29, 2014 along with the music video directed by Fernando Lugo. A remix featuring vocals from Puerto Rican singer Farruko was released on September 23, 2014.

Promotional singles
"Da Show" was released online as promotional single on July 22, 2013. The music video, directed by Luis Carmona, includes visual exclusive, captured through his phone over the time.

"Déjate Amar" was released as promotional single on June 27, 2014. On April 30, a preview of the video, directed by LabTwenty, was released through his Instagram account.

"En La Oscuridad" was released on July 8, 2014 as promotional single from the album with a digital download release, taking form as a salsa version (not included on the album) featuring Puerto Rican recording artist, Gilberto Santa Rosa.

De Líder a Leyenda VIP Tour
De Líder a Leyenda VIP Tour is the first concert tour by Yandel. The first leg commenced on June 5, 2014 in San Francisco, and concluded on June 28, 2014 in Miami, the second leg commenced on September 13, 2014 in Concepción, Paraguay, and will conclude on November 19, 2014 in Las Vegas. An extended play, entitled Legacy: De Líder a Leyenda Tour (EP), was released exclusively to digital marketplaces to support the tour.

Tour dates

Track listing

Credits and personnel
Credits adapted from AllMusic.

Llandel Veguilla Malave – Vocals, Composer, Executive Producer 
Javid Álvarez – Composer, Featured Artist
Ramon L. Ayala – Composer
Michelle Baluja – Vocals (Background)
Ed Coriano – Stylist
Daddy Yankee – Featured Artist
Josias De La Cruz – Composer, Producer
Victor Delgado – Composer
Nelson Diaz – Composer
Mateo Garcia – Photography
Chris Gehringer – Mastering
El General Gadiel – Featured Artist
Gabrielle Herrera – Label Manager
Jorge Sanchez – Marketing
Armando Lozano – Management
Luny Tunes – Producer, Vocals
Gadiel Veguilla Malavé – Composer
Marcos G – Engineer
Andy Martinez – Management
Marcos Masis – Composer

Marcos "Tainy" Masis – Producer
Christopher Montalvo – Composer
Don Omar – Featured Artist
Eliezer Palacios – Composer
Carlos Pérez – Creative Director, Image Development
Rafael Pina – Engineer
El Predikador – Producer, Vocals
Christian Ramos – Composer
Alejandro Reglero – A&R
Juan Rivera – Engineer
Gabriel Rodríguez – Composer
Jean Rodríguez – Composer, Engineer, Vocal Arrangement, Vocals (Background)
Francisco Saldaña – Composer
Pedro Santana – Composer
Geancarlos Rivera Tapia – Composer
Jonathan Rivera Tapia – Composer
Juan Toro – Booking
Alberto "The Legacy" Torres – Composer, Producer
Roberto "Tito" Vazquez – Composer, Engineer, Mixing, Producer
Fabian Worell – Composer

Charts and certifications

Weekly charts

Year-end charts

Certifications

See also
List of number-one Billboard Latin Albums from the 2010s

References

2013 albums
Yandel albums
Spanish-language albums
Sony Music Latin albums
Albums produced by Luny Tunes
Albums produced by Nely